UTC+07:20 is an identifier for a time offset from UTC of +07:20.

History
UTC+07:20 was used as daylight saving time in Malaya and Singapore between 1933 and 1941. On midnight January 1, 1933, people in Malaya and Singapore switched from UTC+07:00 to UTC+07:20 when clocks were turned forward 20 minutes. This time was used till midnight of September 1, 1941 when UTC+07:30 started to be used.

See also
Singapore Standard Time
Time in Malaysia
UTC+07:30

References

UTC offsets
Time in Singapore